1931 earthquake may refer to:
1931 Hawke's Bay earthquake
1931 Dogger Bank earthquake 
1931 Nicaragua earthquake

See also
List of earthquakes in 1931